Stiven Rivić (born 9 August 1985) is a Croatian former professional footballer who played as a midfielder.

Career
Born in Pula, Rivić started his career with the youth side of NK Pula. He moved around to a couple of clubs, before returning to NK Pula. Finally, he was signed by Energie Cottbus in 2006. Rivić was capped for the under-21 national team.

He scored his first Bundesliga goal on 6 May 2008 in his side's 1–1 draw against Karlsruher SC. In the next fixture against Hamburger SV, he scored again as his side gained a 2–0 victory. In next season he scored just one goal, and in the same season his club was relegated to 2. Bundesliga.

In July 2010, Rivić signed a three-year contract with 1. FC Kaiserslautern. The contract was dissolved prematurely in January 2012. Rivić then joined Prva HNL club Istra 1961 in February 2012.

On 6 August 2012, Rivić rejoined Cottbus on a two-year contract. He left the club at the end of the 2013–14 season after they had been relegated from the 2. Bundesliga.

On 24 March 2017, Rivic came back into football, joining Hampton & Richmond Borough in England's National League South, the sixth tier of football in the country.

References

External links
 
 

1985 births
Living people
Sportspeople from Pula
Association football midfielders
Croatian footballers
Croatia under-21 international footballers
Sint-Truidense V.V. players
NK Istra 1961 players
FC Energie Cottbus players
FC Energie Cottbus II players
1. FC Kaiserslautern players
Walton & Hersham F.C. players
Hampton & Richmond Borough F.C. players
Belgian Pro League players
Croatian Football League players
Bundesliga players
2. Bundesliga players
National League (English football) players
Croatian expatriate footballers
Expatriate footballers in Germany
Croatian expatriate sportspeople in Germany
Expatriate footballers in England
Croatian expatriate sportspeople in England